Girls of the Sun is a 2018 French drama film directed by Eva Husson. It was selected to compete for the Palme d'Or at the 2018 Cannes Film Festival.

Cast
 Golshifteh Farahani as Bahar
 Emmanuelle Bercot as Mathilde, inspired by Marie Colvin
  as Tiresh

Reception
The film was nominated for the Palme d'Or at the 2018 Cannes Film Festival. The site's critical consensus reads, "Girls of the Sun has the best of intentions, but this worthy - and thoroughly timely - story is fatally undermined by its clumsily overbearing execution." Agnès Poirier noted that the film initially received "high praise at Cannes" but later "an overwhelming majority of we critics found the film appalling: dreadfully written, poorly directed, verging on obscenity for treating tragedy with Valkyrie-like music and aestheticised images".

References

External links
 

2018 films
2018 drama films
2010s English-language films
2010s French-language films
French drama films
2010s Arabic-language films
Kurdish-language films
Films about Islamic State of Iraq and the Levant
Films directed by Eva Husson
War films based on actual events
2018 multilingual films
French multilingual films
2010s French films